The lenticulostriate arteries, anterolateral central arteries, or antero-lateral ganglionic branches are a group of small arteries arising from the initial part M1 of the middle cerebral artery that supply the basal ganglia.

Structure
The lenticulostriate arteries are also known as the lateral striate arteries that arise from the middle cerebral artery. 

The other striate artery is the medial striate artery known as the recurrent  artery of Heubner that arises from the anterior cerebral artery.

The lenticulostriate arteries originate from the initial segment (M1) of the middle cerebral artery (MCA). They are small perforating arteries, which enter the underside of the brain at the anterior perforated substance to supply blood to part of the basal ganglia and posterior limb of the internal capsule. The lenticulostriate perforators are end arteries. The name of these arteries is derived from some of the structures they supply, namely the lentiform nucleus and the striatum.

Clinical significance
Blockage of the lenticulostriate arteries causes lacunar infarcts. These infarcts are most often due to hyaline arteriosclerosis secondary to hypertension. This can lead to contralateral paresis (muscular weakness) and/or sensory loss of the face and body.

References

Le, Tao and Bhushan, Vikas. First Aid for the USMLE Step 1 2017 (p.484). New York: McGraw-Hill Education, 2017.

External links
 
 http://www.dartmouth.edu/~humananatomy/part_8/chapter_43.html

Arteries of the head and neck